Édouard Delaporte (14 November 1909 – 6 July 1983) was a French painter, architect, and sculptor.

Biography 
Delaporte was born in Paris in 1909. In 1929, at age 20, he began painting. He graduated from the Ecole Nationale Superieure des Beaux-Arts in Paris, and in 1937 he became an architect certified by the government. In 1939 he was drafted to serve in World War II. After the war, in 1946, Delaporte left France and moved to Rabat, Morocco. For ten years he built many public buildings, villas, and private homes. In 1956, when Morocco gained independence, he returned to France and settled in Antibes. In 1978 he moved to Saint-Jeannet, a small town in the interior of Nice, where he devoted himself to painting. He died on 6 July 1983 at his home, Place sur le Four.

Major exhibitions
1959: Picasso Museum, in the Castle of Antibes .
1961: Group exhibition "Les Revenants" in the Musée Picasso, Château d'Antibes.
1963: Exhibition particularly in Paris with Camille Renaud .
1963: Solo exhibition, 23, Place Saint-André-des-Arts, Paris. Submitted by René de Solier .
1971: House of Culture of Firminy, by Jacques Prévert .
1972: Sculpture exhibition in the Musée Picasso, Château d'Antibes. Catalog, "Sculptures present ones pair Michel Butor ".
1973: Picasso Museum, Château d'Antibes. Paintings and Sculptures. Submitted by Romuald Dor of Souchère .
1974: The House of Culture of Grasse .
1975: Picasso Museum, Château d'Antibes. Submitted by Romuald Dor of Souchère .
1985: Exhibition of Edouard Delaporte, as part of the event "Le Parlement des Idoles" 
1985: Villa Arson, Nice .
1994: Gallery Mantoux-Gignac. Submitted by Michel Butor Cf "Evocation".
2002: Exhibition particular, "Epouvantails et architecture." Space Paul Mayer, University of Picardie Jules Verne.

Architecture
Among the best and most famous architectural works of Édouard Delaporte include the following:
Foch Stadium Gymnasium in Rabat
Ben Kemoun residential block in Rabat, Morocco 1952
Border crossing in Khedadra
North Perceptions Rabat
House for an architect in Rabat
Villa in Salé, Morocco
Villa Menguy in Rabat, Morocco 1952

1909 births
1983 deaths
École des Beaux-Arts alumni
20th-century French painters
French male painters
20th-century French sculptors
20th-century French male artists
Architecture in Morocco
Architects from Paris
20th-century French architects